The John E Bush House is a historic house at 1516 Ringo Street in Little Rock, Arkansas.  It is a two-story wood-frame structure, with a front gable roof and clapboard siding.  A single-story gabled porch, its gable nearly matching that of the main roof, projects from the front, supported by fieldstone columns.  The gable ends feature half-timbering effect typical of the Craftsman/Bungalow style.  The house was designed by Thompson & Harding and built in 1919.

The house was listed on the National Register of Historic Places in 1982.

See also
National Register of Historic Places listings in Little Rock, Arkansas

References

Houses on the National Register of Historic Places in Arkansas
Houses completed in 1919
Houses in Little Rock, Arkansas
American Craftsman architecture in Arkansas
Bungalow architecture in Arkansas
National Register of Historic Places in Little Rock, Arkansas